Ruth Hale (October 14, 1908 – April 20, 2003) was an American playwright and actress.

Biography
Hale was born in Granger, Utah (now West Valley City), and was an active member of the Church of Jesus Christ of Latter-day Saints. She and her husband, James Nathan Hale, moved to California to seek out opportunities in Hollywood. With little success finding film roles, they founded the Glendale Centre Theater.  Ruth Hale wrote many original plays for the venue including A Choice Land and How Near the Angels.

Soon, they and their extended family had opened a number of theaters featuring a center stage (arena theaters or Theater in the round) throughout Utah and Arizona.

The Hales were also playwrights. They wrote their first play together, Handcart Trails, to save on the budget of a ward play production in Granger in the 1930s. This play was published in the MIA Book of Plays in 1940. Their play, Melody Jones, was shown to a national audience by Kurt Television Theatre.

Filmography

Director and producer
Oliver Cowdery: Witness to the Book of Mormon (1954)- Screenplay writer and co-producer with her husband.
A Choice Land (1954)- producer.
Is Fast Day A Headache (1956)- producer.

Actor
Pioneers in Petticoats (1969)
The Singles Ward (2002)
The R.M. (2003)
The Home Teachers (2004)
Hard Times (2005)

References

External links

 
Website of Hale Centre Theatre in Sandy, Utah
Nathan and Ruth Hale plays, MSS 1278, L. Tom Perry Special Collections, Harold B. Lee Library, Brigham Young University

1908 births
2003 deaths
Actresses from Utah
Writers from Utah
Latter Day Saints from Utah
20th-century American dramatists and playwrights
American stage actresses
People from West Valley City, Utah
Place of death missing
Latter Day Saints from California
20th-century American women writers
20th-century American actresses
21st-century American actresses